Head Rush (also billed as Head Rush Refresh in 2011) is a spin-off of the popular MythBusters show airing on Discovery's Science Channel since it debuted in 2010.

Described by Discovery as a "commercial free hour of MythBusters mashups, hosted by Kari Byron", the show features about ten minutes of new material—experiments and quizzes presented by Kari, as well as TV celebrity and scientist appearances, pitching the idea that "science is cool"—interwoven in fifty minutes of material from MythBusters episodes.

These celebrity segments include "Cool Jobs In Science", which has featured other Science, Discovery, and TLC stars such as Dr. Michio Kaku (Sci Fi Science), Cake Bosss Buddy Valastro, Dr. G: Medical Examiners Dr. Jan Garavaglia, and each of the other four MythBusters.

Episodes

Series overview

Season 1 (2010)

Season 2 "Refresh" (2011)

References

External links 
 
 

2010 American television series debuts
2011 American television series endings
2010 Australian television series debuts
2011 Australian television series endings
American television spin-offs
Australian television spin-offs
Science Channel original programming
Television shows set in San Francisco
Television series by Beyond Television Productions
MythBusters